Nino Tsiklauri (born 1 July 1993) is a Georgian alpine skier. She competed for Georgia at the 2010 Winter Olympics and was a Flag Bearer for the country at the 2014 Winter Olympics.
She also competed for Georgia at the 2018 Winter Olympics.

References

External links
 
 

1993 births
Living people
Alpine skiers at the 2010 Winter Olympics
Alpine skiers at the 2014 Winter Olympics
Alpine skiers at the 2018 Winter Olympics
Alpine skiers at the 2022 Winter Olympics
Female alpine skiers from Georgia (country)
Olympic alpine skiers of Georgia (country)
Sportspeople from Tbilisi